Pediglissa is a subclass of phagotrophic protists that inhabit soil or freshwater habitats. They were defined in 2018 according to phylogenetic analyses that showed a clade containing the orders Cercomonadida and Glissomonadida. They're the sister group of Paracercomonadida.

Morphology and behavior
Pediglissa are biciliate protists that glide on their posterior cilium and have a strong tendency to become amoeboid during feeding, unlike the metromonads. Their pseudopodia are more often shaped like rounded lamellae than finger-like or filose pseudopodia, unlike the paracercomonads. Their anterior cilium is often well developed, unlike in helkesids, but can be short in glissomonads; it moves with an undulating oar-like beat. The trophic cells (i.e. feeding forms) are naked, without a theca, scales, or perles, unlike in Thecofilosea and many freshwater Imbricatea.

Diversity
Pediglissa includes the majority of known cercozoan soil flagellates, all gliding on a single posterior cilium only: the largely bacterivorous Cercomonadida, and the Glissomonadida which include pansomonads and the algivorous Viridiraptoridae of recent description.

References

External links
Cercozoa subclasses
Taxa described in 2018